Honeymoon for Three may refer to:

 A Honeymoon for Three, a 1910 short starring J. Warren Kerrigan
 Honeymoon for Three (1915 film), a British comedy directed by Maurice Elvey
 Honeymoon for Three (1935 film), a British musical featuring Stanley Lupino
 Honeymoon for Three (1941 film), an American romantic comedy starring Ann Sheridan and George Brent
Honeymoon for Three (novel), a 1975 novel by Ugandan novelist Jane Bakaluba

See also
 Three on a Honeymoon (disambiguation)